Tim Middleton (born June 15, 1969), known professionally by his stage name DJ U-Neek, is an American Los Angeles-based hip hop record producer. Signed to Ruthless Records along with Bone Thugs-n-Harmony, he was nominated for a Grammy Award for Best Rap Album at the 38th Annual Grammy Awards for his production duties on E. 1999 Eternal. Beside his work with Bone Thugs-N-Harmony members and affiliates, he also produced tracks for Low B, The Godfather D, Yo-Yo, Menajahtwa, Mack 10, Angie Stone, Meyhem Lauren and Troy Ave among others. He released his debut studio album Ghetto Street Pharmacist on Thump Street Records in 1999.

Discography 

 1999: Ghetto Street Pharmacist
 2003: Bone Instrumentals
 2009: Bone Instrumentals Pt. 2

Production discography

Awards and nominations 

!
|-
|align=center|1995
|E. 1999 Eternal
|Grammy Award for Best Rap Album
|
|

References

External links 
 
 

1969 births
Living people
Hip hop record producers
American record producers